The 1992–93 League of Ireland First Division season was the 8th season of the League of Ireland First Division.

Overview
The First Division was contested by 10 teams and Galway United F.C. won the division. This season saw the introduction of a promotion/relegation play-off. Third placed Monaghan United F.C. played off against Waterford United F.C. who finished in tenth place in the 1992–93 League of Ireland Premier Division. The winner would compete in the 1993–94 League of Ireland Premier Division.

Final table

Promotion/relegation play-off

1st Leg

2nd Leg

Monaghan United F.C. won 5–3 on aggregate and are promoted to Premier Division

See also
 1992–93 League of Ireland Premier Division

References

League of Ireland First Division seasons
2
Ireland